CHERUB is a series of teenage spy novels written by English author Robert Muchamore, focusing around a fictional division of the British Security Service called CHERUB, which employs children, predominantly orphans, 17 or younger as intelligence agents.

Initially, the series follows James Choke, better known as James Adams (his adopted name at CHERUB), as he enters CHERUB and performs various missions. However, the focus later expands to other characters, such as James' sister Lauren and several other characters who work alongside him and in separate missions. The initial series of 12 novels runs from the recruitment of Adams aged 11 to his retirement from CHERUB at age 17. The second series of five novels, Aramov, follows Ryan Sharma, another CHERUB agent; James Adams reappears in this series as a CHERUB staff member.

Muchamore also wrote a seven-part series called Henderson's Boys, which takes place during World War II and explains how CHERUB was founded, following the path of a 12-year-old French orphan named Marc Kilgour who meets Charles Henderson and shows him how much help children can be to win the war. Henderson, following this, creates a small unit of children to be trained in espionage.

The series has achieved great critical success. Christopher Middleton of The Times called the series "convincing" and praised the way it allows readers to "grow up with the characters". After its release in the United Kingdom, the novels have been released in the United States, New Zealand, and Australia, and have been translated into several languages including: Polish, French, Danish, Spanish, Russian, Czech, Norwegian, Estonian, and Portuguese. On his website, Muchamore states that over 8 million copies have now been sold. A film adaptation was hinted at in 2009, but no further information was ever given. In 2018, Sony announced they were developing a TV series based on the CHERUB books.

Original series
The first series primarily follows James Adams, a 12-year-old boy who is later joined at CHERUB by his sister Lauren after their mother dies from drinking alcohol while on painkillers.

The Recruit 

After the death of his mother, James Choke joins CHERUB. With the help of fellow trainee, Kerry Chang, he passes basic training. Meanwhile, James' half-sister Lauren Onions joins CHERUB following the imprisonment of her abusive father, Ron. A couple of months later, James goes on a mission to Wales to thwart an attack on an oil conference by eco-terrorist group Help Earth.

Class A

Titled The Dealer in the United States and The Mission for 5,000 copies. James, Kyle, Kerry, Nicole, and mission controllers Zara and Ewart Asker help to take down the cocaine supplier gang KMG. They move into a house on the same estate as Keith Moore and his children. James' duty is to befriend the head of KMG's son, Junior Moore, to attempt to get valuable information on his father's illegal activities. Things take an unexpected turn and a trip to Keith's holiday home in Miami is in order.

Maximum Security

Many CHERUB missions have resulted in criminals being put behind bars, but one is now scheduled for James and Dave to bust someone out. James and Dave go undercover inside a maximum security prison in Arizona to break out Curtis Oxford, the son of an illegal arms dealer. Their hope is that Curtis will lead them to her.

The Killing

James and Dave go to find out why a small-time crook called Leon Tarasov suddenly appears to become extremely rich, and they uncover a plot much larger than a robbery: the murder of Will Clarke.

Divine Madness

James, Lauren and Dana investigate a religious cult named The Survivors in Australia with suspected links to the eco-terrorist organisation Help Earth.

Man vs Beast

James, Lauren and Kyle infiltrate a pro-animal rights terrorist group.

The Fall

The Fall is the seventh novel in the series. It was published on 15 March 2007.

When a mission in Russia goes wrong, CHERUB agent James tries to clear his name after being implicated in the deaths of two MI5 agents, while Lauren goes on a mission to expose a sex slave trafficking gang.

Mad Dogs

James and Bruce infiltrate a gang tussling with rivals for control of the Luton underworld after the collapse of KMG.

The Sleepwalker

James' sister Lauren and Jake Parker go undercover to befriend a boy who claims that his father is responsible for a deadly plane crash in the Atlantic. Meanwhile, James is put into an uncomfortable situation as he is forced to do work experience with his ex-girlfriend.

The General

After an uncomfortable break-up, James, Lauren, and other CHERUB agents join the SAS and play insurgents in a US army training exercise in Fort Reagen. However the odds are stacked against them and only a master plan from CHERUB instructor Yosyp Kazakov can win the war for the Brits. Kazakov and James also cheat casinos to win a lot of money using card counting.

Brigands M.C.

James, Lauren and Dante Scott infiltrate a violent biker gang called the Brigands M.C trying to incriminate their ruthless leader, known only as "the Führer" for arms dealing charges, and to avenge the deaths of Dante's family years before.

Shadow Wave

James turns down a final mission at CHERUB guarding a politician, instead helping his best friend and retired CHERUB agent Kyle Blueman to expose the politician's wrongdoings.

Aramov
This series involves an almost completely new cast of CHERUB agents, centred upon Ryan Sharma. However, characters from the original series appear occasionally. The first three books focus on a mission to dismantle the fictional Aramov Clan. As of December 2016, five novels have been announced.

People's Republic

Ryan investigates (and befriends) a young boy called Ethan whose extended family are the leaders of a Kyrgyzstan-based terrorist group known as the Aramov Clan.

Guardian Angel
Ryan is tasked with destroying the Aramov Clan after Ethan is kidnapped by his uncle who seeks to take over the business. Ethan gets sent to Africa and gets treated poorly but escapes

Black Friday

Ryan has to stop the biggest terrorist attack in U.S. history as Aramov operations wind down, and James Adams returns to CHERUB campus. Meanwhile, they must find a way to stop Leonid once and for all and it's up to James and Leonid's ex-wife and son to put a stop to the ruthless mobster before he disappears forever.

Lone Wolf

Ryan infiltrates a drug gang. Ning befriends Fay, a girl whose mother was murdered by the gang and may have vital information on how the organisation works.

New Guard

New Guard is the final novel in the CHERUB series. It features characters from both the first and second CHERUB series in one big mission to rescue two hostages from the Islamic state in a high stakes mission to end all.

Short stories

Dark Sun

Released for World Book Day, Rat and Andy go undercover to befriend a boy whose father is a member of Dark Sun, a criminal organisation dealing in nuclear weapons technology. Chronologically, the story fits in between The Sleepwalker and The General.

Other publications

CHERUB: Ultimate Edition
CHERUB: Ultimate Edition consists of a map of CHERUB campus, a biography of Muchamore, and the novels The Recruit and Class A.

The Recruit: The Graphic Novel

The Recruit was released as a graphic novel, illustrated by Ian Edginton and John Aggs.

International releases
The CHERUB novels have been released in twenty-seven countries to date.

Setting
The series' main location is CHERUB campus, the headquarters of the fictional titular British government agency CHERUB for which the children work. It was formed during World War II by Charles Henderson; a British spy who had used children during an operation in France. It is populated by around 350 adolescents and children, who live on the campus when not on a mission to help the police. No one in the world knows where CHERUB campus is situated except its employees, members and certain police and high level members of the British government.

CHERUB began with a small number of boys which swelled in size as the government realised its worth. After several years of operation it took in a trial group of girls, which proved successful. Since then CHERUB campus has grown a significant amount, improving many of its facilities. The dojo was built on behalf of a successful operation that took place in Japan and the new mission preparation building was built by the chairman of the first 6 novels, Dr. McAfferty, better known as Mac. After retiring at the end of Man Vs Beast, he is replaced by Zara Asker, who holds the role for ten years until stepping down to be replaced by husband Ewart Asker shortly before New Guard.

After years of speculation, Muchamore said in the Henderson's Boys novel Eagle Day that CHERUB stood for Charles Henderson Espionage Research Unit B; this was later confirmed in Secret Army by Eileen McAfferty in a telegram.

Characters
 James Adams is the main protagonist of the series. He is a strong, stocky boy ranging from just under twelve to eighteen years old through the course of the series. Although usually friendly, he does occasionally have anger management issues. During the series he has had two on-campus girlfriends, Kerry Chang and Dana Smith, as well as various girlfriends on missions. He gets on well with his half-sister Lauren Adams.
 Lauren Adams is James' sister. She is headstrong and does well in missions, however she does create various schemes to pay people back for actions, which result in her receiving punishments. She has a boyfriend called Rat.
 Kyle Blueman is another CHERUB agent who is friends with James. He was recruited when he was eight years old. He is gay, something that James has trouble coming to terms with. He is kind, but will also conduct revenge schemes, including one in which he exposes politician Tan Abdullah as conducting illegal activities in Shadow Wave, the twelfth book of the series.
 Kerry Chang is a James' main love interest throughout most of the series. She befriends James in the first novel and helps him get through basic training. She is also a Hong-Kong born karate champion.
 Bruce Norris is a CHERUB agent who is friends with James. Bruce is a small but very strong kid; he is a campus karate champion.
 Greg "Rat" Rathbone is about a year younger than James. He is Lauren Adams' boyfriend. He was recruited in the fifth book, Divine Madness.

See also

Eco-terrorism in fiction

References

External links

 
 French fan website

 
Book series introduced in 2004
Eco-terrorism in fiction
Young adult novel series
Junior spy novels
Hodder & Stoughton books